The Gold Coast Broadwater, also known as Southport Broadwater, Gold Coast Harbour and The Broadwater, is a large shallow estuary of water located in the  district of South East Queensland, Australia. Separated via the Seaway from the Coral Sea by a thin strip of land called Stradbroke Island, the original body of water was a lagoon created from water deposited from the Nerang River. Part of the Broadwater is contained within the Moreton Bay Marine Park.

Location and features

The entrance of the Nerang River was at Main Beach in the late 19th century but by the 1980s had moved about  northwards.  The Seaway was completed in 1986 to stabilise the location of the Nerang River Entrance.  Its construction has allowed greater tidal flows.  This has created a larger tidal range within the Broadwater with lower low tides.  Towards the northern end of the broadwater the Pimpama River enters. The broadwater is very large and contains lots of species of marine life. Gold Coast Ferries operates a number of services across the waterway. Curlew Island, a popular habitat for bird species including the Far Eastern curlew, emerged from the Broadwater over the last four decades.

The Broadwater has undergone dramatic changes since the 1970s including the construction of an extensive number and network of artificial waterways that account for up to 90% of Australia's canal estates. Positioned in one of the fastest growing regions in the developed world, urbanisation surrounding the Broadwater is expected to continue. The region has important biodiversity values that have led to areas of the Broadwater listed as an international Ramsar site and inclusion to international migratory bird arrangements. The Broadwater provides a vital function in the provision of feeding, spawning and nursery sites for recreationally and commercially important finfish species.

The Broadwater catchment includes a number of watercourses including the Logan/Albert, Coomera, Pimpama and Nerang Rivers. Creeks such as the Loders, Biggera and Behm and Wasp also flow into the estuary.

The most common seagrass species in the body of water is Zostera muelleri which grows in the shallower parts.  Halophila ovalis and Halophila spinulosa are also found in the deeper waters of the Broadwater.

History
Captain Patrick Logan was the first European to discover this southern entrance to Moreton Bay. In the early 1880s the first Southport Pier was opened to the public. On 26 November 1925, the Jubilee Bridge opened to pedestrian and vehicular traffic, becoming the first bridge to be erected in the Broadwater area. The bridge provided direct access between Southport and Main Beach and offered an alternative to, and eventually replaced, the ferry services which had transported passengers from the jetty, in the vicinity of later day Barney Street, across the water at the point where the Nerang River meets the Broadwater.

In 1966-1967, the Jubilee Bridge was replaced by the Gold Coast Bridge, colloquially known as the Sundale Bridge due to its proximity to the Sundale Shopping Centre. The two bridges were on different alignments and, for a period of time, both were in place until the demolition of the earlier bridge commenced. The Jubilee Bridge was on an east-west alignment commencing at Queen Street, Southport before ending in the vicinity of the Southport Yacht Club at Main Beach on the southern bank of the Nerang River. The Gold Coast Bridge was on a north-south alignment following the path of the Gold Coast Highway. The Gold Coast Bridge has since been joined by a bridge for light rail on its western side and a pedestrian bridge on its eastern side.

Construction of the Gold Coast Seaway was undertaken between 1984 and 1986.  Plans for a cruise ship terminal and resort on Wave Break Island were rejected by the Queensland Government in 2015.

Broadwaterway

The Broadwaterway is a  foreshoreway along the foreshores of the Gold Coast Broadwater. The Broadwaterway includes: 
 The Spit arm
 the Marine Stadium, 
 western Spit foreshores (including Sea World, Fishing fleet, Versace Hotel, Marina Mirage, Versace Hotel, Water Police, Sea Scouts and the Southport Yacht Club)
 Pelican Beach at Main Beach
 Southport Broadwater Parklands
 Marine Parade and Harley Park Labrador
 Broadwater Esplanades of Biggera Waters, Runaway Bay and Hollywell.
 Paradise Point Broadwater Parklands
Fisherman's Wharf was located on the site of the present-day Versace Hotel. A popular and regionally iconic hospitality and entertainment complex (known to locals as Fishos), Fisherman's Wharf opened in 1983 before closing in 1998.

See also

 List of rivers of Queensland
 Southern Moreton Bay Islands
 Southern Moreton Bay Islands National Park
 Sports on the Gold Coast, Queensland

References

External links

Geography of Gold Coast, Queensland
Bays of Queensland
Sports venues on the Gold Coast, Queensland
Southport, Queensland